is a Japanese footballer currently playing as a midfielder in the WE League.

Career statistics

Club

Notes

International

References

1993 births
Living people
People from Takatsuki, Osaka
Association football people from Osaka Prefecture
Japanese women's footballers
Japan women's international footballers
Women's association football midfielders
Nadeshiko League players
AC Nagano Parceiro Ladies players
TEPCO Mareeze players
Speranza Osaka-Takatsuki players
Mynavi Vegalta Sendai Ladies players
WE League players